Technical variations of Linux distributions include support for different hardware devices and systems or software package configurations. Organizational differences may be motivated by historical reasons. Other criteria include security, including how quickly security upgrades are available; ease of package management; and number of packages available.

These tables compare notable distribution's latest stable release on wide-ranging objective criteria. It does not cover each operating system's subjective merits, branches marked as unstable or beta, nor compare Linux distributions with other operating systems.

General 

The table below shows general information about the distributions: creator or producer, release date, the latest version, etc.

Linux distributions endorsed by the Free Software Foundation are marked 100% Free under the System distribution commitment column.

Technical 
The table below shows the default file system, but many Linux distributions support some or all of ext2, ext3, ext4, Btrfs, ReiserFS, Reiser4, JFS, XFS, GFS2, OCFS2, and NILFS. It is possible to install Linux onto most of these file systems. The ext file systems, namely ext2, ext3, and ext4 are based on the original Linux file system.

File systems have been developed by companies to meet their specific needs, by hobbyists, or adapted from Unix, Microsoft Windows, and other operating systems. Linux has full support for XFS and JFS, FAT (the DOS file system), and HFS, the main file system for the Macintosh. Support for Microsoft Windows NT's NTFS file system has been developed and is now comparable with other native Unix file systems. CDs, DVDs, and Blu-ray discs' ISO 9660 and Universal Disk Format (UDF) are supported.

Unlike other operating systems, Linux and Unix allow any file system regardless of the medium it is stored on, whether that medium is a magnetic disk, an optical disk (CD, DVD, etc.), a USB flash memory key, or even contained within a file located on another file system. Similarly, many C compilers (mainly GNU Compiler Collection (GCC)), init systems (mainly sysvinit), desktop environments and window managers are widely supported.

Instruction set architecture support
Linux kernel portability to instruction set architectures other than x86, was an early feature added to the kernel.

Package management and installation
Information on features in the distributions. Package numbers are only approximate. Some distributions like Debian tend to separate tools into different packages – usually stable release, development release, documentation and debug. Also counting the source package number varies. For debian and rpm based entries it is just the base to produce binary packages, so the total number of packages is the number of binary packages. For Arch based entries, it is additional.

Live media

Security features

Apple Silicon Support

See also

 Comparison of netbook-oriented Linux distributions
 Comparison of operating systems
 DistroWatch
 List of Linux distributions

Notes

References

External links
 Linux free distros (Free Software Foundation)
 Repository tracking
 The LWN.net Linux Distribution List – Categorized list with information about each entry.
 Distrowatch – Announcements, information, links and popularity ranking for many Linux distributions.
 Linux Distros – Information and ISO files for many oldest Linux distributions.

 
Linux distributions